Thane Alexander Camus (born November 27, 1970) is an American TV personality and actor in Japan.

Biography
Camus was born in New York on November 27, 1970. Camus arrived in Japan in 1980 and graduated from a board school in Fujisawa, Kanagawa Prefecture. He is a native in English and Japanese and can speak some French as well. He was the first male graduate of Saint Maur International School (est.1872) once it became coeducational. He entered Hofstra University, Long Island, but dropped out before he graduated. 

His great-uncle was Albert Camus.

Career in Japan
Camus was a regular on the Sanma Akashiya show Sanma's Super Karakuri TV for many years, in which he quizzed Japanese passers-by in English and foreigners in Japanese on the streets of Tokyo, and has appeared as a special guest on multiple variety shows.

In 2005, Camus left his previous talent agency of 14 years, R&A Promotions. He has since co-founded his own talent agency, "Eclipse Production", for foreign professionals looking for work in the broadcasting business.

As of 2019, Camus is a co-host on J-Trip Plan, a travel show in English on the Japanese national broadcaster NHK.

Filmography

Commercials
 Street Fighter II' Plus (1993) (Vega, Balrog in Japan)

Theatrical animation
 Crayon Shin-chan: The Legend Called: Dance! Amigo! (2006)

Video games
 Valkyria Chronicles 4 (2018) (Xanthus)

Television
 Sakura (2002) (Robert Hoffman)
 Zero: Black Blood (2014) (Ring)
 Garo: Makai no Hana (2014) (Luke/Stellas)
 Kamen Rider Ghost (2016) (Steve Bills)
 Segodon (2018) (Harry Smith Parkes)

References

External links
 Media International website
 Official blog 
 

1970 births
Living people
Expatriate television personalities in Japan
American expatriates in Japan
American people of French descent